Agatha Cerqueira Pereira Moreira (born January 19, 1992) is a Brazilian actress and model. She became known after her participation in the twentieth season of the teen telenovela Malhação in 2012; before this, she worked as model in several countries where she did numerous advertising campaigns, appeared in magazine articles and was the face for various known brands. She starred in Em Família in 2014 and was recognized for her performance in Verdades Secretas in 2015. More recently she has starred in several other novelas, including her breakout role in A Dona do Pedaço, in 2019.

Biography 
Born in a humble family in Rio, Brazil, Agatha was raised in the suburban neighborhood of Olaria. Agatha always wanted to be a model and actress. Even though the family didn't have the financial means, they still came together and got her an agency. She was soon selected because of her beauty. She won the competition and started working as a model at the age of 14 in 2006.  Soon after, she invested the money she made from modeling  into training courses to become an actress. She started getting small roles in theater, and eventually managed to get on TV in 2012.

Career
She debuted as an actress in 2012 and excelled playing Ju, the protagonist of 20th season of Malhação of Rede Globo. In 2014 she was part of the cast of Em Família, as the spoiled Giselle.

In 2015 she had play Giovanna, a rich and reckless young woman who prostitutes herself, in Verdades Secretas. She also participated in the 9th edition of the show Dança dos Famosos in Domingão do Faustão. In 2019 she participated in the soap opera A Dona do Pedaço as Josiane, a young woman who hates her mother.

Filmography

Television

Videoclips

Awards and nominations

References

External links
 

1992 births
Living people
Actresses from Rio de Janeiro (city)
Brazilian television actresses
Brazilian female models
21st-century Brazilian actresses